C-Lion 1 is a submarine communications cable between Finland and Germany. It is the first direct communications cable between Finland and Central Europe. Previous connections have been through Sweden and Denmark. Laying of the cable started in October 2015 and was finished in January 2016. The cable is 1173 kilometres long, has 8 fiber pairs and a total capacity of 144 terabits per second.

C-Lion 1 has landing points in:

Hanko, Finland
Helsinki, Finland
Rostock, Germany

References

External links 
 C-Lion 1 on submarinecablemap.com

Baltic Sea
Submarine communications cables in the North Atlantic Ocean
2016 establishments in Finland
2016 establishments in Germany
Infrastructure completed in 2016